The Hotel Charlotte, at 18736 Main St. (CA 120) in Groveland, California was listed on the National Register of Historic Places in 1994.

The listing includes the Hotel Charlotte building, originally  in plan plus an L-shaped rear porch, which was later enclosed and expanded. Both were constructed by builder Frank Ferretti.

References

Hotels in California
National Register of Historic Places in Tuolumne County, California